is a railway station on the Kagoshima Main Line, operated by JR Kyushu in Kita-ku, Kumamoto, Japan.

Lines 

Layout 
The station consists of two side platforms serving two tracks on a side hill cutting. A steep sloping ramp leads up to the station from the access road. The station building is a simple, functional, brick structure which is unstaffed and serves only as a waiting room. Access to the opposite side platform is by means of a footbridge.

Adjacent stations

History
Japanese Government Railways (JGR) opened Tabaruzaka signal box on 1 October 1943 on the existing track of the Kagoshima Main Line. On 1 October 1965, Japanese National Railways (JNR) upgraded the facility to full station. With the privatization of JNR on 1 April 1987, JR Kyushu took over control of the station.

Passenger statistics
In fiscal 2014, the station was used by an average of 24 passengers daily (boarding passengers only).

References

External links
Tabaruzaka (JR Kyushu)

Railway stations in Kumamoto Prefecture
Railway stations in Japan opened in 1965